The Iloilo Strait is a strait in the Philippines that separates the islands of Panay and Guimaras in the Visayas, and connects Panay Gulf with the Guimaras Strait.  It is the location of the Port of Iloilo, the third-busiest of the ports in the Philippines in number of ships.  Iloilo City on Panay is the major city located on the strait with Buenavista and Jordan, both on Guimaras, immediately across the strait from the city.  The Iloilo River empties into the strait.

Pump boat ferries cross every few minutes from Iloilo City to Guimaras and vice versa.  Ships doing business with the Port of Iloilo often moor in the strait.

History

The Port of Iloilo was opened for international trade in 1855 and the coming of British Vice-consul Nicholas Loney, a year later, led to the fast development of the sugar industry in the region.

Incidents
2GO Travel's ferry St. Gregory The Great nearly capsized on 15 June 2013, when it struck rocks under the water near the Siete Picados Islands.

Iloilo Strait Tragedy

In midday of August 3, 2019, two motor boats "Chi-chi" (43 passengers on board) & "Keziah 2" (with only 4 crews survived) bounded to Jordan, Guimaras were capsized due to strong southwest monsoon winds enhanced by Tropical Depression "Hanna" (Int'l name Lekima). Several hours after an incident another motorboat from Buenavista, Guimaras named "Jenny Vince" (40 passengers on board) were also capsized due to strong winds. 31 passengers were perished in tragedy including teachers.

2020 Iloilo Oil Spill Incident

The incident happened in Friday afternoon (July 3, 2020) where one of the two power barges of National Power Corporation (NAPOCOR) exploded spilling an estimated 251,000 liters of fuel by Saturday morning. Nobody was injured, but by Sunday morning, about 400 residents were evacuated amid the spreading smoke from the bunker fuel, according to the Iloilo City Risk Reduction Management Office.
Some 179,300 liters of bunker fuel were collected from the water's surface on Sunday, according to a report by the Coast Guard station in Iloilo.

See also
List of East Asian ports

References

External links 
 
 Philippine Ports Authority

Straits of the Philippines
Iloilo City
Landforms of Iloilo
Landforms of Guimaras